Giulio Monaco (died 1581) was a Roman Catholic prelate who served as Bishop of Lucera (1580–1581).

Biography
On 4 Nov 1580, Giulio Monaco was appointed during the papacy of Pope Gregory XIII as Bishop of Lucera. On 13 Nov 1580, he was consecrated bishop by Giulio Antonio Santorio, Cardinal-Priest of San Bartolomeo all'Isola, with Thomas Goldwell, Bishop of Saint Asaph, and Filippo Spinola, Bishop of Nola, serving as co-consecrators. He served as Bishop of Lucera until his death in 1581.

References

External links and additional sources
 (for Chronology of Bishops)  
 (for Chronology of Bishops)  

16th-century Italian Roman Catholic bishops
Bishops appointed by Pope Gregory XIII
1581 deaths